There are multiple Cabrillo High Schools:

Cabrillo High School (Lompoc, California) in Lompoc, California.
Cabrillo High School (Long Beach, California), "Juan Rodriguez Cabrillo High School" in Long Beach, California